Shravanabelagola Assembly constituency is one of the 224 Legislative Assembly constituencies of Karnataka state in India.

It is part of Hassan district.

Members of the Legislative Assembly

Election results

2018

Gallery

See also
 List of constituencies of the Karnataka Legislative Assembly
 Hassan district

References

Hassan district
Assembly constituencies of Karnataka